The Festival Stakes is an Australian Turf Club  Group 3 Thoroughbred quality handicap horse race, for horses aged three years old and older, over a distance of 1500 metres, held annually at Rosehill Racecourse, Sydney, Australia in early December. Total prize money for the race is A$200,000.

History

Name
 1948–2001 - Festival Handicap
 2002 onwards - Festival Stakes

Grade
 1948–1978 - Principal race
 1979–2015 - Listed race
 2016 - Group 3

Distance
 1948–1972 - 7 furlongs (~1400 metres)
 1973–1983 - 1400 metres
 1984 - 1350 metres
 1985–1990 – 1300 metres
 1991 - 1280 metres
 1992–2001 - 1300 metres
 2002–2006 - 1400 metres
 2008 onwards - 1500 metres

Venue
 1948–1983 - Rosehill Racecourse
 1984 - Canterbury Park Racecourse
 1985–1990 - Rosehill Racecourse
 1991 - Canterbury Park Racecourse
 1992 onwards - Rosehill Racecourse

Winners

 2022 - Dajraan
 2021 - Ellsberg
 2020 - Outrageous
 2019 - Ranier
 2018 - My Nordic Hero
 2017 - Testashadow
 2016 - Sweet Redemption
 2015 - Mighty Lucky
 2014 - I'm Imposing
 2013 - White Sage
 2012 - Malavio
 2011 - Monton
 2010 - Dysphonia
 2009 - Rabbuka
 2008 (Dec.) - Voice Commander
 2008 (Jan.) - Eremein
 2007 - †Race not run
 2006 - Utzon
 2005 - Spirit Of Tara
 2004 - Ike's Dream
 2003 - This Manshood
 2002 - This Manshood
 2001 - Nanny Maroon
 2000 - Adam 
 1999 - Highest Calibre 
 1998 - Monet's Cove 
 1997 - Masked Party
 1996 - Sherwood
 1995 - Garrin 
 1994 - Headstrong
 1993 - Welsh Miner
 1992 - Top Comedian
 1991 - Fort Isle
 1990 - Ice Cream Sundae 
 1989 - Dance Band 
 1988 - Tetue Topaze
 1987 - Allamanda Boy 
 1986 - Plum Shore
 1985 - At Sea
 1984 - Manuan
 1983 - Nosey Parker
 1982 - Artist Man
 1981 - Grey Receiver
 1980 - Robrick Star 
 1979 - Mondiso 
 1978 - Tattenham Lad 
 1977 - Dream Pratten
 1976 - Just Ideal
 1975 - Purple Patch
 1974 - Magic Beam
 1973 - Barrier Star 
 1972 - Rocky Gold 
 1971 - Race not run
 1970 - King Bogan 
 1969 - Regal Rhythm 
 1968 - Todvale
 1967 - Victory Roll 
 1966 - Aureo 
 1965 - Castanea 
 1964 - Liege Lord 
 1963 - Miss Hiliers 
 1962 - Our Cobbler 
 1961 - Ginnagulla 
 1960 - Race not run 
 1959 - Boorala 
 1958 - Amneris 
 1957 - Indian Empire
 1956 - Compound 
 1955 - Belbeiys 
 1954 - Blond Val 
 1953 - Bronze Peak 
 1952 - Forest Beau 
 1951 - Coniston 
 1950 - Hesdin 
 1949 - Blue Ensign 
 1948 - Cragside 

† Race moved to January 2008 because of outbreak of equine influenza

See also
 List of Australian Group races
 Group races

References

Horse races in Australia